The 27th parallel north is a circle of latitude that is 27 degrees north of the Earth's equatorial plane. It crosses Africa, Asia, the Pacific Ocean, North America and the Atlantic Ocean.

At this latitude the sun is visible for 13 hours, 51 minutes during the summer solstice and 10 hours, 26 minutes during the winter solstice.

Around the world
Starting at the Prime Meridian and heading eastwards, the parallel 27° north passes through:

{| class="wikitable plainrowheaders"
! scope="col" width="125" | Co-ordinates
! scope="col" | Country, territory or sea
! scope="col" | Notes
|-
| 
! scope="row" | 
|
|-
| 
! scope="row" | 
|
|-
| 
! scope="row" | 
|
|-
| style="background:#b0e0e6;" | 
! scope="row" style="background:#b0e0e6;" | Red Sea
| style="background:#b0e0e6;" |
|-
| 
! scope="row" | 
|
|-
| style="background:#b0e0e6;" | 
! scope="row" style="background:#b0e0e6;" | Persian Gulf
| style="background:#b0e0e6;" | Passing just north of Lavan Island, 
|-
| 
! scope="row" | 
|
|-valign="top"
| style="background:#b0e0e6;" | 
! scope="row" style="background:#b0e0e6;" | Persian Gulf
| style="background:#b0e0e6;" | Passing just north of Qeshm island,  Passing just south of Hormuz Island, 
|-
| 
! scope="row" | 
| 
|-valign="top"
| 
! scope="row" | 
| Balochistan Sindh
|-valign="top"
| 
! scope="row" | 
| Rajasthan Uttar Pradesh Bihar
|-
| 
! scope="row" | 
| Birgunj
|-
| 
! scope="row" | 
| West Bengal
|-
| 
! scope="row" | 
|
|-valign="top"
| 
! scope="row" | 
| Arunachal Pradesh - claimed by  Assam Arunachal Pradesh
|-
| 
! scope="row" |  (Burma)
|
|-valign="top"
| 
! scope="row" | 
| YunnanSichuanYunnanGuizhouHunan (for about 4 km)GuizhouHunan - passing just north of HengyangJiangxi - passing just south of Ji'anFujian
|-
| style="background:#b0e0e6;" | 
! scope="row" style="background:#b0e0e6;" | East China Sea
| style="background:#b0e0e6;" |
|-
| 
! scope="row" | 
| Iheya island
|-valign="top"
| style="background:#b0e0e6;" | 
! scope="row" style="background:#b0e0e6;" | Pacific Ocean
| style="background:#b0e0e6;" | Passing just north of Okinawa Island,  Passing just south of Yoronjima,  Passing just south of Chichi-jima, 
|-
| 
! scope="row" | 
| Baja California peninsula
|-
| style="background:#b0e0e6;" | 
! scope="row" style="background:#b0e0e6;" | Gulf of California
| style="background:#b0e0e6;" |
|-
| 
! scope="row" | 
| Passing just south of Navojoa and just north of Monclova
|-
| 
! scope="row" | 
| Texas - mainland and Padre Island
|-
| style="background:#b0e0e6;" | 
! scope="row" style="background:#b0e0e6;" | Gulf of Mexico
| style="background:#b0e0e6;" |
|-
| 
! scope="row" | 
| Florida - Passing through Port Charlotte and Hobe Sound
|-
| style="background:#b0e0e6;" | 
! scope="row" style="background:#b0e0e6;" | Atlantic Ocean
| style="background:#b0e0e6;" |
|-
| 
! scope="row" | 
| Great Sale Cay
|-
| style="background:#b0e0e6;" | 
! scope="row" style="background:#b0e0e6;" | Atlantic Ocean
| style="background:#b0e0e6;" | Passing between the Fish Cays and the Pensacola Cays, 
|-
| 
! scope="row" | Western Sahara
| Claimed by 
|-
| 
! scope="row" | 
|
|-
| 
! scope="row" | 
|
|}

See also
26th parallel north
28th parallel north

References

n27
Borders of Western Sahara